Boris Alekseyevich Sinitsyn (born August 11, 1953) is a Russian professional football coach and a former player. He works as an administrator with FC Sakhalin Yuzhno-Sakhalinsk.

External links
 Career summary by KLISF

1953 births
Living people
Soviet footballers
FC SKA Rostov-on-Don players
FC Dynamo Stavropol players
Russian football managers
PFC Spartak Nalchik managers
Russian expatriates in Latvia
FK Ventspils managers
FC Sodovik Sterlitamak managers
Association football defenders
FC Dynamo Saint Petersburg players
FC Sever Murmansk players
Russian expatriate football managers